The 2007 FIA GT Zolder 2 Hours was the tenth and final race of the 2007 FIA GT Championship season.  It took place at Circuit Zolder, Belgium, on October 21, 2007.

Unofficial results
Class winners in bold.  Cars failing to complete 75% of winner's distance marked as Not Classified (NC).  Cars with a C under their class are running in the Citation Cup, with the winner marked in bold italics.

Statistics
 Pole Position – #33 JetAlliance Racing – 1:25.812
 Average Speed – 157.54 km/h

References

Z